梅 may refer to:

Prunus mume
Mei (surname)